Distant Worlds 2 is a 4X video game developed by Code Force and published by Slitherine Software. It was released for Windows on March 10, 2022 and is the sequel to the 2010 video game Distant Worlds.

Gameplay 
Players establish a space-faring empire and manage it in pausable real-time. The game is very customizable and operates on a grand scale where empires can comprise hundreds of planets. The game can be automated to take care of micromanagement or systems that players find tedious, such as ship design, research, or war. Players can, for example, tell the game what kinds of fleets they want built, what kinds of strategies they should use, and set rules of engagement, such as automatically seeking out pirates and attacking them. The game can be configured to require authorization for these decisions or to simply report them with the option of a veto. The civilian economy can not be directly controlled by the player, but it can be indirectly guided by choices such where mining stations are established.

Development 
CodeForce said that the game was "rebuilt from the ground up" from the first game because of the aging game engine. The number of playable factions was decreased because of the game's added complexity. The old factions still exist in the game and can give bonuses if conquered or assimilated. The first game's 2D graphics are replaced with fully 3D models. Slitherine released the game on March 10, 2022.

Reception 
Distant Worlds 2 received positive reviews on Metacritic.  Sin Vega of Rock Paper Shotgun wrote that the game has "a lot of potential" but needs work balancing and patching bugs before it can be wholeheartedly recommended.  Writing for PC Gamer, Fraser Brown called the game "an elaborate space opera as interested in minutiae as it is with the big picture".  Brown praised the game's customizability and automation, which he said "allow you to create the 4X you want to play".  Comparing the game's ability to be automated to an ant farm, Wargamer reviewer Matt Bassil wrote, "The individual parts are functional, but the whole is quite spectacular."

References

External links 
 

2022 video games
4X video games
Space opera video games
Windows games
Single-player video games
Indie video games
Slitherine Software games